The 2019–20 season was Club Brugge's 128th season in existence and the club's 60th consecutive season in the top flight of Belgian football. In addition to the domestic league, Club Brugge participated in this season's editions of the Belgian Cup, the UEFA Champions League, and the UEFA Europa League. The season covered the period from 1 July 2019 to 1 August 2020.

Players

Current squad

Out on loan

Pre-season and friendlies

Competitions

Overview

Belgian Division

Regular season

League table

Results summary

Results by round

Matches
On 2 April 2020, the Jupiler Pro League's board of directors proposed to cancel the season due to the COVID-19 pandemic. The General Assembly accepted the proposal on 15 May, and officially ended the 2019–20 season.

Belgian Cup

UEFA Champions League

Third qualifying round

Play-off round

Group stage

UEFA Europa League

Knockout phase

Round of 32

Statistics

Squad appearances and goals
Last updated on 7 March 2020.

|-
! colspan=14 style=background:#dcdcdc; text-align:center|Goalkeepers

|-
! colspan=14 style=background:#dcdcdc; text-align:center|Defenders

|-
! colspan=14 style=background:#dcdcdc; text-align:center|Midfielders

|-
! colspan=14 style=background:#dcdcdc; text-align:center|Forwards

|-
! colspan=14 style=background:#dcdcdc; text-align:center|Players who have made an appearance this season but have left the club

|}

References

Belgian football clubs 2019–20 season
Club Brugge KV seasons
Belgian football championship-winning seasons